Arnaud Dje Bi Mani (born 17 December 2001) is a Ivorian professional footballer who plays for Oslo FA.

References

External links 
 
 

2001 births
Living people
Ivorian footballers
Ivorian expatriate footballers
Expatriate footballers in Belarus
Expatriate footballers in Senegal
Association football midfielders
FC Energetik-BGU Minsk players
People from Divo, Ivory Coast